Engine 51 is known for its time in the 1970s TV show Emergency!. Engine 51 is actually two very different fire engines. Both Engines 51 sit in the Los Angeles County Fire Museum right next to the famous Squad 51. The museum is building a new facility that will house the Squad 51 in Carson, California, where the show was filmed.

Crown Coach E51
The first apparatus used as Engine 51 for Emergency! was a 1965 Crown Firecoach Triple. It has a pump producing 1,250 gallons per minute, a 935 cubic inch Hall-Scott gasoline engine producing 195 or 215 horsepower.

The first "Engine 51" was an actual Los Angeles County Fire Department (LACoFD) engine assigned to Fire Station 60 on the lot of Universal Studios. LA County Engine 60 was the Los Angeles County Fire Department's last open cab fire engine. It was in service at Universal Studios from 1965 to about 1987 when it was placed in the care of the Los Angeles County Fire Museum in Bellflower, California, United States, where it resides today. Showing only 20,000 miles on the odometer it is the lowest mileage fire apparatus on the LACoFD. In original condition, the Museum plans to only touch up the paint where needed and maintain this Crown in as original condition as possible.

For the first two seasons, when filming on the Universal Studio lot, this is the engine that was used, as it was readily available. Engine 60 became Engine 51 by putting magnets or stickers over the numbers 60 on the doors and the front. A sister, Engine 127, at the Station 127 in Carson, was used when they filmed off the lot, at the refinery, or at the old fire station. This engine was involved in a traffic accident and destroyed leaving engine 60 as the only original E51.

Ward LaFrance E51
The second Engine 51, a 1973 Ward LaFrance, was retrieved by the County of Los Angeles Fire Museum on August 8, 2008 from Yosemite National Park. It was in service there since the 1980s. The fire department took good care of the engine while it was in service.

The 2nd Engine 51 is a 1000gpm triple combination P-80 Ambassador model powered by a Cummins NH855 250hp naturally aspirated diesel engine driving through an Allison HT-70 power shift transmission. The LACoFD rigs were 1250 gpm triples powered by Cummins NHCT295 turbocharged Diesels driving through Allison HT-70 5 speed manual transmissions. They had 500-gallon booster tanks, as did Engine 51. In their outward appearance both E-51 and the LACoFD rigs were identical. All the County Ward rigs plus E-51 had Federal Q2B sirens and Grover Stutter-tone air horns.

In 2010, The County of Los Angeles Fire Museum started to restore the Ward back to its 1970s appearance, and equip it fully, as when it starred as Engine 51. The restoration was finished in 2012.

References

External links
 1965 Crown Firecoach in Emergency!, TV Series, 1972-1978
 1973 Ward LaFrance P80 Ambassador in Emergency!, TV Series, 1972-1978

Emergency!
Firefighting equipment
History of Los Angeles County, California
Vehicles introduced in 1965
Bellflower, California